Kue makmur (Malay: kuih makmur,) is a traditional Malay kue or kuih. This cake made from butter, ghee and flour, and served during special occasion of Eid al-Fitr. Kue makmur is identified with its white colour and usually in a round shape.

History 
The origin of kue makmur is somewhat uncertain and believed to be derived from the Middle Eastern ma'amoul that was introduced by Arab merchants throughout the Malay Archipelago. Since then, kue makmur has been a part of the traditional kue or kuih of Brunei, Indonesia, Malaysia and Singapore. In 2015, kue makmur was featured in a series of Singaporean stamps. Loosely translated, they would be called "prosperous biscuits (UK)/cookies (US)".

See also 

 Kue
 Kuih
 Ma'amoul

References 

Kue
Bruneian cuisine
Indonesian desserts
Malaysian snack foods
Singaporean cuisine